Silver Creek, Minnesota may refer to:
Silver Creek, Lake County, Minnesota, an unincorporated community in Lake County
Silver Creek, Wright County, Minnesota, a census-designated place in Wright County